The wide-striped ctenotus (Ctenotus xenopleura)  is a species of skink found in Western Australia.

References

xenopleura
Reptiles described in 1981
Taxa named by Glen Milton Storr